The Communauté de communes Gâtinais-Val de Loing is a communauté de communes in the Seine-et-Marne département and in the Île-de-France région of France. It was formed on 1 January 2010, and also contains the communes of the former Communauté de communes de la Campagne Gâtinaise. Its seat is in Château-Landon. Its area is 338.0 km2, and its population was 18,662 in 2019.

Composition
The communauté de communes consists of the following 20 communes:

Arville
Aufferville
Beaumont-du-Gâtinais
Bougligny
Bransles
Chaintreaux
Château-Landon
Chenou
Égreville
Gironville
Ichy
Lorrez-le-Bocage-Préaux
La Madeleine-sur-Loing
Maisoncelles-en-Gâtinais
Mondreville
Obsonville
Poligny 
Souppes-sur-Loing
Vaux-sur-Lunain
Villebéon

References 

Gatinais-Val de Loing
Gatinais-Val de Loing